Gallichan is a municipality in northwestern Quebec, Canada, in the Abitibi-Ouest Regional County Municipality located along the banks of the Duparquet River. It had a population of 484 in the Canada 2011 Census.

The municipality was constituted on January 1, 1958.

Demographics
Population trend:
 Population in 2011: 484 (2006 to 2011 population change: 5.7%)
 Population in 2006: 458
 Population in 2001: 476
 Population in 1996: 478
 Population in 1991: 482

Private dwellings occupied by usual residents: 193 (total dwellings: 307)

Mother tongue:
 English as first language: 0%
 French as first language: 97.8%
 English and French as first language: 2.2%
 Other as first language: 0%

Municipal council
 Mayor: André Légaré
 Councillors: Serge Marquis, Claude Bourque, Martine Goulet Gosselin, Brigitte Rivard, Henri Bourque, Éric Fournier

References

Municipalities in Quebec
Incorporated places in Abitibi-Témiscamingue
Populated places established in 1922